Capicua transcriptional repressor is a protein that in humans is encoded by the CIC gene. Capicua functions as a transcriptional repressor in a way that ensures its impact on the progression of cancer, and plays a significant role in the operation of the central nervous system through its interaction with ataxin 1. The name of the protein derives from the Catalan expression cap-i-cua which literally translates to "head-and-tail".

Structure
Capicua is a highly conserved protein, with a lot of similarity between human and Drosophila melanogaster. In the human body, capicua exists in two isoforms, the short (CIC-S) and the long (CIC-L) one, which differ in their N-terminal section. The two evolutionarily conserved domains of the protein are HMG-box (high-mobility group box) and the C1 domain: they work together to recognize specific octameric DNA sequences. Capicua also contains a nuclear localisation sequence that allows it to enter the nucleus of the cell.

Clinical significance
A new disorder called autosomal dominant intellectual developmental disorder 45 caused by mutations of the CIC gene was first described in 2017.

Spinocerebellar ataxia
Capicua forms a complex with ataxin 1 (CIC-ATXN1 complex) and owing to this interaction it plays a crucial role in the development of spinocerebellar ataxia type 1. While in a healthy organism this complex serves to ensure correct cellular function, in patients with ATXN1 mutations a modified complex has a toxic effect on cerebellar cells, resulting in the motor symptoms typical for this disorder. Blocking the formation of the complex in a murine model of ataxia reduces the symptoms.

Tumors
CIC has been shown to act as a tumor suppressor in numerous types of cancer, and, vice versa, mutations of CIC have been found in some types of tumors. According to a review published in 2020, CIC mutations were most often discovered in oligodendroglioma. A genomic translocation resulting in the formation of a hybrid CIC-DUX4 gene may cause an aggressive Ewing-like sarcoma. Instead of acting as a suppressor, a hybrid protein produced by fusion of CIC and DUX4 has been shown to act as an activator of genes.

According to a review published in 2017, the CIC gene is deleted in 46%-53% of analyzed oligodendroglioma tumors as part of the 1p/19q codeletion, a mutation that may also affect the FUBP1 gene.

Ongoing research
According to a study published in 2021, CIC mutations may be among the causes of cerebral folate deficiency.

History
The CIC gene was first identified in Drosophila in 2000. It was shown to encode a transcriptional repressor participating in the regulation of embryogenesis. In a mutated fly which at the embryonic stage had only the first and the last segments present, with the intermediate segments missing, scientists discovered a mutation of the CIC gene, and this prompted them to call the protein capicua ("head-and-tail" in Catalan).

Interactions
 FOLR1 — capicua has been shown to affect the expression of folate receptor alpha, and CIC mutations might result in cerebral folate deficiency.
 ATXN1 — capicua and ataxin 1 form a complex (ATXN1-CIC) which is crucial for proper brain development.
 DUX4 – chimeric CIC-DUX4 proteins are found in tumors.
 FOXO4 – chimeric CIC-FOXO4 proteins are found in tumors.
 NUTM1 – chimeric CIC-NUTM1 proteins are found in tumors.
 LEUTX – chimeric CIC-LEUTX proteins are found in tumors.

References

Further reading

External links
 

Tumor suppressor genes